Henry Craik may refer to:

Sir Henry Craik, 1st Baronet (1846–1927), Scottish Unionist Member of Parliament 1906–1927
Sir Henry Duffield Craik (1876–1955), member of the Indian Civil Service during the British Raj
Henry Craik (evangelist) (1805–1866), Scottish Hebraist, theologian and preacher